Asaphistis is a genus of moths belonging to the subfamily Olethreutinae of the family Tortricidae. The genus was erected by Edward Meyrick in 1909.

Species
The genus includes the following species:
Asaphistis asema Diakonoff, 1973
Asaphistis catarrhactopa (Meyrick, 1938)
Asaphistis cretata Diakonoff, 1953
Asaphistis gypsopa Diakonoff, 1953
Asaphistis haematina Diakonoff, 1953
Asaphistis hemicapnodes Diakonoff, 1953
Asaphistis hemicyclica Diakonoff, 1953
Asaphistis lucifera Meyrick, 1909
Asaphistis maturicolor Diakonoff, 1973
Asaphistis nobilis Diakonoff, 1973
Asaphistis omora Razowski, 2013
Asaphistis phanerops Diakonoff, 1973
Asaphistis praeceps Meyrick, 1909
Asaphistis protosema Diakonoff, 1973
Asaphistis purpurescens Diakonoff, 1953
Asaphistis sappiroflua Diakonoff, 1953

See also
List of Tortricidae genera

References

Olethreutini
Tortricidae genera
Taxa named by Edward Meyrick